HD 5789 and HD 5788 is a pair of stars comprising a binary star system in the northern constellation of Andromeda. Both stars are main-sequence stars, meaning that they are currently fusing hydrogen into helium in their cores. As of 2016, the pair had an angular separation of  along a position angle of 195°. While both have a similar proper motion and parallax, there's still no proof that the pair is gravitationally bound.

The primary component is HD 5789, a B-type main-sequence star with a stellar classification of B9.5Vnn (λ Boo), where the 'n' indicates "nebulous" lines due to rapid rotation. Abt and Morrell (1995) listed it as a Lambda Boötis star, although this is disputed. It has 2.7 times the mass of the Sun and is spinning rapidly with a projected rotational velocity of 249 km/s. The star is radiating 86 times the Sun's luminosity from its photosphere at an effective temperature of 9,977 K.

The fainter secondary component is an A-type main-sequence star with a class of A2 Vn. It shows a projected rotational velocity of 270 km/s and has 2.7 times the Sun's mass. The star shines with 73 times the Sun's luminosity at an effective temperature of 9,840 K.

References

A-type main-sequence stars
B-type main-sequence stars
Binary stars
Andromeda (constellation)
BD+43 0193
005788
004675
0282